Kanwarpura is a village of Katewas found in the Chirawa tehsil of Jhunjhunu, Rajasthan.

Villages in Jhunjhunu district